This article gives an overview of the Team3M cycling team during season 2015.

Overview 
 Main sponsor: 3M
 General manager: Bernard Moerman
 Team leaders: Frank Boeckx, Walter Maes, Tim Lacroix
 Bicycles: Cannondale

Team Roster

Season victories

External links 
 Team3M Officiële website
 Team3M op www.wvcycling.com

2015 road cycling season by team
2015 in Belgian sport